Addae Tuntum Festival (Akwasidae Tuntum) is an annual festival celebrated by the chiefs and people of Kukuom-Asunafo in the Ahafo Region, formerly Brong Ahafo region of Ghana. It is usually celebrated in the month of January or in December.

Celebrations 
During the festival, visitors are welcomed to share food and drinks. The people put on traditional clothes and there is durbar of chiefs. There is also dancing and drumming.

Significance 
This festival is celebrated to mark the event of the Ebirimoro war between the Sefwis and Ahafos in the 18th century. The festival is also held to re-affirm the people's commitment to their chief.

References 

Festivals in Ghana
Ahafo Region